The Quick Draw McGraw Show is an American animated television series produced by Hanna-Barbera Productions, and their third television series overall after The Ruff and Reddy Show and The Huckleberry Hound Show. Voice actor Daws Butler performed the show's title character, Quick Draw McGraw.

The show debuted in syndication on September 28, 1959, ended its run on October 20, 1961, and was sponsored by Kellogg's. The series featured three cartoons per episode, with Quick Draw and his sidekick Baba Looey appearing in the first segment, father and son dog duo Augie Doggie and Doggie Daddy in the second, and cat and mouse detectives Snooper and Blabber in the third. There were also "bumpers," mini-cartoons between the main cartoons that featured Quick Draw and other main characters on the show.

Michael Maltese wrote all of the episode stories. Screen Gems originally syndicated the series. It ran on CBS Saturday mornings for one season, 1965-66.

Segments

Quick Draw McGraw and Baba Looey
Quick Draw (voiced by Daws Butler) was usually depicted as a sheriff in these short films set in the American Old West. Quick Draw was often accompanied by his deputy, a Mexican burro called Baba Looey (also voiced by Butler). Although technically the side-kick, or deputy, to the main character of Sheriff Quick Draw, Baba Looey is often portrayed as the more thoughtful half of the duo; at times realizing some detail about a given situation and trying desperately without success to caution Quick Draw of a trap or other danger.  The exchange would always go as follows:  Baba Looey would see a fatal flaw in Quick Draw's plan, and begin voicing a warning such as "I don' thin' we should be doing...", to which Quick Draw would angrily interrupt with his frequent catchphrase, "I'll do the 'thin'in' around here, Baba Looey!" His plans would then go disastrously wrong, and Quick Draw would be forced to realize he should have listened to Baba Looey.

Quick Draw was assisted in some cartoons by his bloodhound Snuffles (voiced by Butler), who refused to work until he was given a dog biscuit, after which he would hug himself and spring into the air, floating back down to Earth.

Quick Draw spent a number of cartoons as his alter ego, the masked El Kabong, who used a guitar (a "Kabonger") to bash bad guys into submission. Writer Michael Maltese said the character was inspired by actor Douglas Fairbanks, Sr. as Zorro.

Augie Doggie and Doggie Daddy

A young dog named Augie Doggie (voiced by Daws Butler) and his father Doggie Daddy (voiced by Doug Young impersonating Jimmy Durante) have different misadventures in their life.

Snooper and Blabber

A detective cat named Super Snooper (voiced by Daws Butler impersonating Ed Gardner as the character Archie from the radio show Duffy's Tavern) and his sidekick Blabber Mouse (voiced by Daws Butler, originally voiced by Los Angeles radio announcer Elliot Field) work for the Super Snooper Detective Agency solving mysteries and catching criminals. In several cartoons, the duo had a private secretary named Hazel (voiced by Jean Vander Pyl) with a Southern accent, who was never seen on screen.

Episodes

Voice cast
 Daws Butler - Augie Doggie, Quick Draw McGraw, Snagglepuss, Baba Looey, Super Snooper, Blabber Mouse, Snuffles, Narrator, Horse Face Harry, Various
 Doug Young - Doggie Daddy, Bigelow Mouse, Narrator, Various
 Elliot Field - Blabber Mouse (4 early episodes), Narrator, Various
 Don Messick - Narrator, Various
 Julie Bennett - Sagebrush Sal (Quick Draw McGraw), Various
 Red Coffey - Duckling (Augie Doggie and Doggie Daddy)
 Vance Colvig - Tombstone Jones (Quick Draw McGraw), Narrator
 Peter Leeds - Narrator (Quick Draw McGraw)
 Jean Vander Pyl -  Hazel (Snooper and Blabber), Mrs. J. Evil Scientist (Snooper and Blabber), Various
 Hal Smith - Narrator, Various

Home media
Season sets of the series for the Hanna-Barbera Classics Collection label was originally announced by Warner Bros. for release in 2006 but was later cancelled due to poor conditions of the masters and the music right issues. In 2006, a Warner spokesperson said of the DVDs, "They were pulled because significant remastering work needed to be researched." Four episodes are available on DVD, the first two episodes on Saturday Morning Cartoons 1960s: Vol. One and the other two on Saturday Morning Cartoons 1960s: Vol. Two.

Baba Booey mispronunciation
On the July 26, 1990, broadcast of The Howard Stern Show, executive producer Gary Dell'Abate was talking about the animation cels that he buys and collects. When attempting to say 'Quick Draw and Baba Looey', he accidentally said 'Quick Draw and Baba Booey'. He said later that talking about it would last a few hours. But since then, hundreds of 'Baba Booey' song parodies have been played on The Howard Stern Show. In addition, 'Baba Booey' was often yelled out during live news broadcasts. Until recently, it was also frequently yelled at golf tournaments after the ball was struck.

See also

 List of Hanna-Barbera characters
 List of works produced by Hanna-Barbera Productions
 Augie Doggie and Doggie Daddy
 Snooper and Blabber

References

External links
 
 
 
 

1950s American animated television series
1960s American animated television series
1950s American anthology television series
1960s American anthology television series
1950s American comedy television series
1960s American comedy television series
1959 American television series debuts
1961 American television series endings
1950s Western (genre) television series
1960s Western (genre) television series
American Broadcasting Company original programming
American children's animated anthology television series
American children's animated comedy television series
Western (genre) animated television series
CBS original programming
English-language television shows
Television shows adapted into comics
Television series by Hanna-Barbera
Yogi Bear television series
Television series by Sony Pictures Television
Television series by Warner Bros. Television Studios
Television series by Screen Gems
Animated television series about horses